İzmit is the central district of Kocaeli province, Turkey. As of the last estimation (made on 31 December 2021), the city center had a population of 367,990. Kocaeli province (including rural areas) had a population of 2,033,441 inhabitants, of whom approximately 1.2 million lived in the largely urban İzmit City metro area made up of Kartepe, Başiskele, Körfez, Gölcük, Derince and Sapanca (in Sakarya Province). Unlike other provinces in Turkey, apart from Istanbul, the whole province is included within the municipality of the metropolitan center.

İzmit was known as Nicomedia in antiquity, and was the eastern and most senior capital city of the Roman Empire between 286 and 324, during the Tetrarchy introduced by Diocletian. Following Constantine the Great's victory over co-emperor Licinius at the Battle of Chrysopolis in 324, Nicomedia served as an interim capital city for Constantine between 324 and 330, when he rebuilt and expanded the nearby city of Byzantium as the new Roman capital; formally dedicating it in 330 with the name Nova Roma, before he soon renamed it as Constantinopolis (modern Istanbul). Constantine died at a royal villa near Nicomedia in 337. During the Ottoman Empire, İzmit was the capital of the Sanjak of Kocaeli.

Name
"İzmit" derives from the Ancient Greek name of the city, Nicomedia, prefixed with εἰς 'to' or 'into' 
(similarly to İstanbul). Names used in English prior to official Turkish Latinization include Ismid, Iskimid, and Isnikmid.

Geography
The geographical location of İzmit is between 40°-41° N and 29°-31° E, surrounded by the Gulf of İzmit at south, Istanbul and the Sea of Marmara at west, the Black Sea at north, and Sakarya at east.

The city is mostly built on hill slopes because of the cramped area, while flat plains surround the gulf, near the sea. This topographic structure divided the city into two parts. The first was created on flat plains, where the city center is located. The railway and highway networks pass from this area which is close to the Sea of Marmara. The second part was built on hills, with many historic houses from the Ottoman period in the old quarters.

History

In Antiquity, the city in Greek was called Astacus or Olbia (founded 712 BC). After being destroyed, it was rebuilt and founded by Nicomedes I of Bithynia in 264 BC under the name of Nicomedia. It remained one of the most important cities in northwestern Asia Minor.

Carthaginian general and statesman Hannibal came to Nicomedia in his final years and committed suicide in nearby Libyssa (modern Gebze), in a date between 183 and 181 BC.

The historian Arrian was born in Nicomedia, which was the metropolis of Bithynia under the Roman Empire (see also Nicaea).

In 286 AD, Roman emperor Diocletian made Nicomedia the eastern capital city of the Roman Empire, when he introduced the Tetrarchy system. Nicomedia remained as the eastern (and most senior) capital of the Roman Empire until Licinius was defeated by Constantine the Great in 324. Constantine mainly resided in Nicomedia as his interim capital city for the next six years; until in 330 he declared the nearby Byzantium as Nova Roma, which eventually became known as Constantinople (modern Istanbul). Constantine died at a royal villa in the vicinity of Nicomedia on 22 May 337. Owing to its position at the convergence of the Asiatic roads leading to the new capital, Nicomedia retained its importance even after the foundation of Constantinople.

In 451, the local bishopric was promoted to a Metropolitan see under the jurisdiction of the Ecumenical Patriarchate of Constantinople.

Nicomedia remained under Byzantine rule until the late 11th century, when it was captured by Seljuk Turks. However, the city soon returned to Byzantine sovereignty as a consequence of the successes of the First Crusade. After the sack of Constantinople in 1204, during the Fourth Crusade, the city of Nicomedia, with most of the Bithynia province, became a part of the Latin Empire. It was recaptured by the Byzantines around 1235 and stayed within Byzantine borders until the first half of the 14th century. The city was conquered by the Ottoman Turks in 1337. Byzantine rule was restored after the Battle of Ankara in 1402, during the Ottoman Interregnum; but the Ottomans reconquered the city in 1419. Under Ottoman rule, it was the capital of the Sanjak of Kocaeli.

In the early 20th century, it remained the seat of a pasha, a Greek metropolitan, and an Armenian archbishop.

İzmit was occupied by the United Kingdom on 6 July 1920, during the Turkish War of Independence. The British left it to Greece on 27 October 1920. İzmit was re-taken by the Turks on 28 June 1921. As of 1920, the British reported that the city had a population of about 13,000. In 1920–1921 atrocities were committed in the city and its surroundings during the Greco-Turkish War (1919–1922) against the civilian population. An Allied report (on 1 June 1921) stated that a large number of excesses were committed by both sides during the last year, while the Turkish atrocities in the Izmit peninsula "have been more considerable and ferocious than those on the part of the Greeks".

The 7.6  earthquake of 17 August 1999 devastated the region with a maximum Mercalli intensity of IX (Violent). The shock killed more than 17,000 people and left half a million homeless. It took several years for the city to recover from this disaster, and traces of the earthquake remain visible.

Main sights

There are numerous tourist attractions in the city center and its adjacent region, such as:
 remains of the ancient Acropolis, Agora, Amphitheater, Nymphaeum, Necropolis
 the Demeter Temple
 the Hellenistic Üçtepeler Mound King Tombs
 Roman city walls, aqueducts and cisterns
 parts of the Temple of Augustus
 parts of the Palace and Arsenal of Diocletian
 the Byzantine fortress at the core of the Roman city walls
 Orhan Gazi Mosque (1333)
 the 14th century Süleyman Paşa Hamam
 the 16th century Imaret Mosque and Pertev Paşa Mosque (1580), designed by the Ottoman chief architect Mimar Sinan
 Pertev Paşa Fountain (1571)
 the 16th century Mehmed Bey Hamam
 Saatçi Ali Efendi Mansion (1776)
 Tüysüz Fountain (1782)
 the early 19th century Fevziye Mosque
 Kapanca Sokağı Fountain and Canfeda Kethüda Kadın Fountain (1827)
 Sırrı Paşa Mansion (mid-19th century)
 Kasr-ı Hümayun Palace
 French Theological School
 Redif Barracks (1863)
 İzmit Clock Tower (1901)
 Kocaeli Museum
 SEKA Paper Museum
 Fethiye Street

Economy

İzmit has a history as a port city. As of 1913, the Turkish government had been working to privatize the port. At that time, Vickers built a temporary dock, bringing a small export business to the area. The British described the port as having little business as of 1920.

During the sanjak period of İzmit, the forested regions of the area were devastated by deforestation. The wood in the region of İzmit was used to produce charcoal, primarily. During the 1920s, the area was also known for manufacturing linen. Factories were rare during that time, so most linen was handmade. It was described as being "coarse" and as being in high demand in Turkey as of 1920. İzmit was the home of two Turkish Army and Navy uniform factories. One made fez hats and the other made cloth. The area made carpet and embroidery, made by mainly Christian women.

İzmit has a large oil refinery and major paper and cement factories. Ford Motor Company has a plant here in a joint venture with Otosan, assembling the Transit/Tourneo (including the new V362 Transit/Tourneo Custom since late 2012) and Transit/Tourneo Connect vans. With Ford's Southampton Assembly Plant closing in July 2013, and the launch of the new Otosan only V363 Transit in 2014, İzmit will be the sole producer of Ford Transit vans for Europe. It is also a transportation hub, being on the main highway and railway lines between Istanbul and Ankara and having a major port.

In the past few years the province has developed into a growth point for the Turkish automotive industry, receiving investments from Ford, Hyundai, Honda and Isuzu. Tyre and rubber products are produced to world-class standard (Goodyear, Pirelli, Lassa and Bridgestone). As of today, Kocaeli province has attracted more than 1200 industrial investments, 108 of which have been established with international capital. Turkey's largest enterprise, the Tüpraş Petroleum Refinery Plant, is in Kocaeli, containing altogether 27% of the national chemical products industry, including petrochemical products. Eighteen of the 100 largest enterprises of Turkey are in Kocaeli and contribute to around 17%-18% of the national tax revenues.

Financial Times affiliated Foreign Direct Investment magazine nominated Kocaeli (the province of which İzmit is the capital) among the 25 European Regions of the Future for 2006–2007. The city was chosen along with Adana for Turkey, which scored the highest points for cost effectiveness against Kocaeli's wider infrastructure, while Adana and Kocaeli tied on points for human resources and quality of life.

The famous Turkish traditional sweet Pişmaniye is a product of İzmit and the Kocaeli Province.

Transport

Located along the commercially-active Black Sea and Marmara Sea shorelines, Kocaeli boasts 5 ports and 35 industrial docks, making it an important communications center, as well as Anatolia's farthest inland contact point and a gateway to global markets. The main transportation routes, the D100 highway and the Trans European Motorway which connects Europe with Asia, along with railway lines, form an intercontinental passage network. İzmit Central railway station is one of the busiest in Turkey, built in 1977 to replace the original station.

Kocaeli neighbours one of the world's largest metropolitan centers, Istanbul.

On 1 March 1958, a small passenger ferry sailing between İzmit and Değirmendere sank due to lodos weather. 272 people died including 38 students and seven crew. 37 passengers and two crew survived the disaster.

Population

Education

Kocaeli University (KOU) was established in the city in 1992. The university has more than 50,000 students. It has established a department of international relations that monitors Bologna developments closely and oversees KOU's participation in the Erasmus and Leonardo da Vinci student mobility schemes. With membership in the European University Association, KOU is aiming for greater international recognition of its academic work.

The university, while focusing on technical and engineering subjects, offers an extensive selection of courses in social sciences and arts as well. Some steps toward certification by ABET (Accreditation Board for Engineering and Technology) are being taken by the Faculty of Engineering, such as adaptation of course content in engineering majors.

Climate
İzmit has a humid subtropical climate (Köppen climate classification: Cfa, Trewartha climate classification: Cf), which is warmer than its surroundings – largely due to its sheltered location – and noticeably wetter during summers than other locations on the northern Sea of Marmara coast further to the west.

Gallery

Historic and modern sites in and around İzmit
 Agora of İzmit
 Citadel of İzmit
 Temple of Augustus of İzmit
 İzmit Clock Tower
 İzmit Bay Bridge

Twin towns – sister cities

İzmit is twinned with:

 Agios Sergios, Cyprus
 Buk (Busan), South Korea
 Čair (Skopje), North Macedonia
 Ceadîr-Lunga, Moldova
 Centar Župa, North Macedonia
 Ilidža, Bosnia and Herzegovina
 Karachi, Pakistan
 Kastrychnitski (Minsk), Belarus
 Kherson, Ukraine
 Momchilgrad, Bulgaria
 Nəsimi (Baku), Azerbaijan
 Pohang, South Korea
 Tiznit, Morocco
 Travnik, Bosnia and Herzegovina
 Vake-Saburtalo (Tbilisi), Georgia
 Vogošća, Bosnia and Herzegovina

Sport
The city's main football club is Kocaelispor, with fans all across the province. The city is also home to women's football team Derince Belediyespor. The multi-sport club Kocaeli B.B. Kağıt S.K. has several sports sections covering a wide range disciplines. Cycling is popular with local team Brisaspor and the Tour of Marmara is hosted.

The city also hosted the following tournaments:

2012 European Junior Open Water Swimming Championships
2012–13 Turkish Cup Basketball
2013 IIHF World Championship Division II
2014 IIHF World U18 Championship Division III
2014–15 EHF Champions League group stage
2015 Boys' Youth European Volleyball Championship

See also

 Astacus in Bithynia
 Balaban, İzmit
 Nicomedia
 Izmit massacres

References

External links
 Official website of Kocaeli (İzmit) Metropolitan Municipality 
 Photos of Izmit (Nicomedia) and its environs on Pinterest

 
Ancient Greek archaeological sites in Turkey
Districts of Kocaeli Province
Populated places in Kocaeli Province
Port cities of the Sea of Marmara
Populated coastal places in Turkey
Places of the Greek genocide